The following is a list of fleet aircraft carriers of the Royal Navy of the United Kingdom.

There are two carriers,  HMS Queen Elizabeth and HMS Prince of Wales, currently in service.

Key

Fleet carriers

HMS Argus

HMS Hermes

HMS Eagle

Courageous class

HMS Ark Royal

HMS Unicorn

HMS Unicorn was an aircraft repair ship and light aircraft carrier; an "aircraft maintenance carrier".

Illustrious class

Implacable class

Colossus class

The 1942 Design Light Fleet Carriers were designed and constructed by civilian shipyards to serve as an intermediate step between the expensive, full-size fleet aircraft carriers and the less expensive but limited-capability escort carriers. Perseus and Pioneer were modified to operate as maintenance carriers.

Majestic class

The 1942 design was modified to take more modern aircraft and these ships became the Majestic-class. Not completed until after the end of the war, most ended up purchased by other navies.

Audacious class

Centaur class

Malta class

Queen Elizabeth class (CVA-01)

Invincible class

Queen Elizabeth class

See also 

Timeline of aircraft carriers of the Royal Navy
List of escort carriers of the Royal Navy
List of seaplane carriers of the Royal Navy
 Aircraft carrier
 List of amphibious warfare ships
 List of aircraft carriers
 List of aircraft carriers in service
 Timeline for aircraft carrier service
 List of aircraft carriers by configuration
 List of sunken aircraft carriers
 List of aircraft carriers of the United States Navy
 Aircraft maintenance carriers of the Royal Navy
 List of ships of the Imperial Japanese Navy
 List of aircraft carriers of Germany
 List of aircraft carriers of Russia and the Soviet Union
 People's Liberation Army Navy Surface Force 
 Fleet of the Royal Canadian Navy
 List of active French Navy ships
 List of active Spanish Navy ships
 List of active Italian Navy ships
 List of active Indian Navy ships
 List of active Japan Maritime Self-Defense Force ships
 list of aircraft carriers of the United States Navy
 list of aircraft carrier classes of the United States Navy
 list of escort aircraft carriers of the United States Navy
 List of aircraft carriers by country

Notes

External links
 Maritimequest Royal Navy aircraft carrier photo gallery

Aircraft carriers
Royal Navy